Boyanka is a Bulgarian feminine given name. Notable people with the name include:

Boyanka Angelova (born 1994), Bulgarian rhythmic gymnast
Boyanka Kostova (born 1993), Bulgarian-Azerbaijani weightlifter

Bulgarian feminine given names